Endsley-Morgan House, also known as the "Reuben Starbuck" House, is a historic home located near Colfax, Guilford County, North Carolina. It consists of brick, two-story, single pile main block built between 1780 and 1792, and a frame rear ell built about 1860. A small one-story, brick, shed roofed wing was added in the early-20th century. The house incorporates stylistic elements of Quaker architecture.

It was listed on the National Register of Historic Places in 1984.

References

Houses on the National Register of Historic Places in North Carolina
Houses completed in 1792
Houses in Guilford County, North Carolina
National Register of Historic Places in Guilford County, North Carolina